Gothenburg Concert Hall is a concert hall located in Gothenburg, Sweden, which was built in 1935. The architect for the facility was Nils Einar Ericsson, a major advocate of Functionalism. However, the Concert Hall has a Neo-Classical exterior look, due to the surrounding area at Götaplatsen where the building is placed – the Art Museum and the City Theatre are solid classically designed buildings as well, and were built before the Concert Hall. In contrast to the exterior, the Concert Hall's interior is modernistic.

The main auditorium’s plain shaped walls are clad in yellowish-red maple veneer and there are 1,300 seats. There is also a smaller concert hall, Stenhammarsalen, for chamber concerts. The acoustic qualities of Gothenburg Concert Hall have given it a reputation well outside the Swedish borders; Deutsche Grammophon has used the Concert Hall as a studio for a number of records, for example.

A number of progressive rock bands (among others Yes and Roxy Music) have also performed at the Gothenburg Concert Hall.

The Concert Hall is the home stage of the Gothenburg Symphony.

See also
List of concert halls

External links
 Gothenburg Concert Hall

Concert
Concert
Concert halls in Sweden
1935 establishments in Sweden
Buildings and structures completed in 1935